A Harold Arlen Showcase is an album by pianist Kenny Drew recorded in 1957 and released on the Riverside Records subsidiary Judson label. The album was rereleased on CD by Milestone Records as a compilation with its companion album A Harry Warren Showcase as Kenny Drew Plays the Music of Harry Warren and Harold Arlen in 1995.

Reception
The Allmusic review called the compilation "melodic, tasteful and lightly swinging... a nice set if not all that essential".

Track listing
 "Come Rain or Come Shine" (Harold Arlen, Johnny Mercer) - 2:43    
 "That Old Black Magic" (Arlen, Mercer) - 3:24    
 "Over the Rainbow" (Arlen, E. Y. Harburg) - 3:12    
 "Between the Devil and the Deep Blue Sea" (Arlen, Ted Koehler) - 2:20    
 "As Long as I Live" (Arlen, Koehler) - 2:48    
 "It's Only a Paper Moon" (Arlen, Harburg, Billy Rose) - 2:15    
 "Stormy Weather" (Arlen, Koehler) - 3:00    
 "I've Got the World on a String" (Arlen, Koehler) - 2:19    
 "Let's Fall in Love" (Arlen, Koehler) - 2:36    
 "Ill Wind" (Arlen, Koehler) - 3:02    
 "Blues in the Night" (Arlen, Mercer) - 2:42    
 "Get Happy" (Arlen, Koehler) - 2:47

Personnel
Kenny Drew - piano
Wilbur Ware - bass

References

Kenny Drew albums
1957 albums
Riverside Records albums
Albums produced by Orrin Keepnews
Harold Arlen tribute albums